Samuel Schmidt (born August 15, 1964) is a former Indy Racing League driver and current NTT IndyCar Series and Indy Lights series team owner. Schmidt's brief IndyCar career included a win in 1999, but an accident before the 2000 season left him a quadriplegic. Schmidt is currently co-owner of the Arrow McLaren SP IndyCar team.

Racing career
After graduating from Pepperdine University, Schmidt became a successful businessman, eventually purchasing his father's parts company in 1989 at the age of 25. He raced at a competitive amateur level, supported by his business income, but dreamed of someday driving in the Indianapolis 500. Schmidt first drove professionally in 1995 in the USAR Hooters Pro Cup Series at the age of 31, where he won Rookie of the Year honors.

In 1997 Schmidt made his first Indy Racing League start and became a rising star in the league. He raced three consecutive years at the Indianapolis 500, and earned his first race victory, from pole position, at Las Vegas in 1999. He finished fifth in series points that year. During that offseason, while testing in preparation for the 2000 season, Schmidt crashed at Walt Disney World Speedway on January 6, 2000. The accident rendered him a quadriplegic, and put him on a respirator for five months.

After leaving the hospital, Schmidt, no longer able to drive a racecar, realized he needed to find a new passion and follow it. Inspired by meeting tetraplegic Formula One team owner Sir Frank Williams, he founded Sam Schmidt Motorsports, which has become the most successful team in the history of the Indy Lights series, winning the 2004 series championship with Thiago Medeiros, the 2006 title with Jay Howard, and the 2007 title with Alex Lloyd. Sam Schmidt Motorsports was a full-time IndyCar series team in 2001 and 2002, and continues to participate annually in the Indianapolis 500. In the Firestone Indy Lights series, as of August 2009 the team had posted 30 victories out of 100 starts.

After acquiring the FAZZT Race Team IndyCar team in 2011, Sam Schmidt Motorsports returned full-time to the IZOD IndyCar Series, and on May 21, 2011, driver Alex Tagliani won the pole position for the Indianapolis 500, the first pole for the team.

Career results

Indy Racing League
(key) (Races in bold indicate pole position)

 1 The 1999 VisionAire 500K at Charlotte was cancelled after 79 laps due to spectator fatalities.

Other
Schmidt won $16,350 on Press Your Luck over the course of three episodes between January 2–4, 1985.
He established the Sam Schmidt Paralysis Foundation to further the cause of paralysis research, treatment and quality-of-life issues.
He was helped by Arrow Electronics to drive again by creating a 2014 Chevrolet Corvette Stingray that is controlled with head movement, voice commands, and by mouth sip/puff actions.
Schmidt currently serves on the board of directors for BraunAbility, a leading manufacturer of wheelchair accessible vehicles and other mobility solutions.

References

External links

Schmidt Peterson Motorsports 
Sam Schmidt Paralysis Foundation

1964 births
Formula Ford drivers
Indianapolis 500 drivers
IndyCar Series drivers
IndyCar Series team owners
Living people
Sportspeople from Lincoln, Nebraska
People with tetraplegia
Racing drivers from Nebraska
Contestants on American game shows
SCCA National Championship Runoffs winners
U.S. F2000 National Championship drivers